Carlos Xavier Rabascall Salazar (born September 3, 1960) is an Ecuadorian journalist, commercial engineer, businessman, and political consultant. In 2017, he was a member of the Front for Transparency and the Fight Against Corruption, a body in charge of proposing policies to prevent corruption in the public and private sectors. In December 2020, it was confirmed that he was part of the Union for Hope coalition together with Andrés Arauz, in the Ecuadorian presidential elections.

Biography
Rabascall was born in Guayaquil on September 3, 1960 into a middle-class family. Because of the effects of the drug called Thalidomide, which affected the formation of the newborn, he was born without a leg, a situation that generated a "hard childhood because of discrimination" he explained later. He completed his basic training at Colegio La Salle and later graduated as a commercial engineer at the Universidad Católica de Santiago de Guayaquil. He has also taken courses in Finance at IDE and participated in the Governance and Political Management Program of the Catholic University of Guayaquil under the auspices of George Washington University.

Further reading 
Carlos Rabascall at Spanish Wikipedia

References

1960 births
Living people
People from Guayaquil
Ecuadorian journalists